József Simándy (Kistarcsa, 18 September 1916 – Budapest, 4 March 1997) was a Hungarian tenor with German origins.  His name in Hungarian form is Simándy József, his original family name is Schulder. A student of Emilia Posszert, he joined the chorus of the  Hungarian State Opera in 1940; in 1946, he made his debut as Don José in Carmen in Szeged. In 1947, he returned to the Budapest Opera, where he was the leading heroic tenor until 1984. He performed regularly in  Munich as well, from 1956 until 1960. Besides heroic tenor roles, Simándy took on lyric and spinto parts as well; he was best known for his  Radames, Lohengrin, and Otello.  Recordings include two operas by Ferenc Erkel, Bánk bán and Hunyadi László, in both of which he sang the title role.

References

Hungarian operatic tenors
People from Pest County
1916 births
1997 deaths
20th-century Hungarian male opera singers
People from Kistarcsa